The Eau Claire Formation is a geologic formation in the north central United States. It preserves trilobite fossils from the Cambrian Period.

See also

 List of fossiliferous stratigraphic units in Indiana

References

 

Cambrian United States
Dolomite formations
Cambrian Kentucky
Cambrian Illinois
Cambrian Indiana
Cambrian Michigan
Cambrian Ohio
Cambrian geology of Wisconsin
Cambrian System of North America
Cambrian southern paleotemperate deposits
Cambrian southern paleotropical deposits